Small finds is an archaeological term for artifacts discovered on excavations which are somewhat special compared with the common finds for that type site or type phase on multi phasic sites. The special nature of the find is dictated by research agendas and the information the artifact can provide. Examples of the increased importance of small finds over other finds would be coins being often thought of as small finds whereas pottery sherd as just finds. The reason is coins can be much more specific when it comes to dating evidence. Small finds are usually treated differently in the recording system; often they are recorded on plan rather than being attributed to a single context like other generic finds.

See also 
Archaeological field survey
Artifact (archaeology)
Assemblage (archaeology)
Dating methodology (archaeology)
Excavation
Post excavation

Methods in archaeology